Arena Condá is a stadium in Chapecó, Brazil. It has a capacity of 20,089 spectators. It is the home of Brazilian Série A club Associação Chapecoense de Futebol.

The Arena Condá was inaugurated on 1 February 2009. The inaugural match occurred in the 2009 Campeonato Catarinense, against Brusque, which ended in a 4–1 victory. Nenén was responsible for scoring the first goal at the Arena and the highest attendance until now was in the match against the Grêmio, in 2014, with a crowd of 19,175 people.

Layout
Number of seats: 1,560 
Social grandstand capacity: 4,099 
East grandstand capacity: 6,718 
South grandstand capacity: 3,650 
North grandstand capacity: 4,062

References

Conda
Associação Chapecoense de Futebol
Sports venues completed in 1976